Wrong Is Right, released in the UK as The Man with the Deadly Lens, is a 1982 American comedy thriller film written, produced and directed by Richard Brooks, based on Charles McCarry's novel The Better Angels. The film, starring Sean Connery as TV news reporter Patrick Hale, is about the theft of two suitcase nukes.

Plot
In the near future, violence has become something of a national sport and television news has fallen to tabloid depths. Patrick Hale, a globe-trotting reporter with access to a staggering array of world leaders, has ventured to the Arab country of Hegreb to interview his old acquaintance, King Ibn Awad.

Awad has learned that the President of the United States may have issued orders for his removal; as a result, Awad is apparently making arrangements to deliver two suitcase nukes to a terrorist, with the intention of detonating them in Israel and the United States, unless the President resigns.

In the intricate plot that unfolds, nothing is quite the way it seems, and Hale finds himself caught between political leaders, revolutionaries, CIA agents and other figures, trying to get to the bottom of it all.

In the final twist, the government, with Hale in tow, locates two atomic bombs supposedly planted by terrorist "Rafeeq" atop the World Trade Center. The U.S. uses this as pretext for invading the Middle East and taking possession of oilfields. Hale correctly intuits that the government had planted the bombs in order to rally U.S. support for the invasion, but gladly covers the story the way the government wants in exchange for front-line access to film the action.

Cast

Awards
Rosalind Cash was nominated for an Image Award for Best Performance by an Actress in a Motion Picture.

See also

References

External links
 
 
 

1982 comedy films
1982 thriller films
1980s American films
1980s comedy thriller films
1980s English-language films
1980s political comedy films
1980s political thriller films
1980s satirical films
American comedy thriller films
American political comedy films
American political satire films
American political thriller films
Columbia Pictures films
Films about the Central Intelligence Agency
Films about fictional presidents of the United States
Films about journalists
Films about nuclear war and weapons
Films about television
Films about terrorism in the United States
Films based on American thriller novels
Films directed by Richard Brooks
Films scored by Artie Kane
Films set in Asia
Films set in a fictional country
Films set in the future
Films set in the Middle East
Films set in New York City
Films shot in New York City